Mordred or Modred (Welsh: Medraut or Medrawt) is a figure in the legend of King Arthur. The earliest known mention of a possibly historical Medraut is in the Welsh chronicle Annales Cambriae, wherein he and Arthur are ambiguously associated with the Battle of Camlann in a brief entry for the year 537. Medraut's figure seemed to have been regarded positively in the early Welsh tradition and may have been related to that of Arthur's son.

As Modredus, Mordred was depicted as Arthur's traitorous nephew and a legitimate son of King Lot in Geoffrey of Monmouth's pseudo-historical work Historia Regum Britanniae, which then served as the basis for the following evolution of the legend from the 12th century. Later variants most often characterised him as Arthur's villainous bastard son, born of an incestuous relationship with his half-sister, the queen of Lothian or Orkney named either Anna, Orcades, or Morgause. The accounts presented in the Historia and most other versions include Mordred's death at Camlann, typically in a final duel, during which he manages to mortally wound his own slayer, Arthur.

Mordred is usually a brother or half-brother to Gawain; however, his other family relations, as well as his relationships with Arthur's wife Guinevere, vary greatly. In a popular telling originating from the French chivalric romances of the 13th century, and made prominent today through its inclusion in Le Morte d'Arthur, Mordred is knighted by Arthur and joins the fellowship of the Round Table. In this narrative, he eventually becomes the main actor in Arthur's downfall: he helps his half-brother Agravain to expose the affair between Guinevere and Lancelot, and then takes advantage of the resulting civil war to make himself the high king of Britain.

Name
The name Mordred, found as the Latinised Modredus in Geoffrey of Monmouth's Historia Regum Britanniae, comes from Old Welsh Medraut (comparable to Old Cornish Modred and Old Breton Modrot). It may be ultimately derived from Latin Moderātus, meaning "within bounds, observing moderation, moderate" with some influence from Latin mors, "death".

Early Welsh sources
The earliest surviving mention of Mordred (referred to as Medraut) is found in an entry for the year 537 in the chronicle Annales Cambriae (The Annals of Wales), which references his name in an association with the Battle of Camlann.

This brief entry gives no information as to whether Mordred killed or was killed by Arthur, or even if he was fighting against him. As noted by Leslie Alcock, the reader assumes this in the light of later tradition. The Annales themselves were completed between 960 and 970, meaning that (although their authors likely drew from older material) they cannot be considered as a contemporary source, having been compiled 400 years after the events they describe.

Meilyr Brydydd, writing at the same time as Geoffrey of Monmouth, mentions Mordred in his lament for the death of Gruffudd ap Cynan (d. 1137). He describes Gruffudd as having eissor Medrawd ("the nature of Medrawd"), as to have valour in battle. Similarly, Gwalchmai ap Meilyr praised Madog ap Maredudd, king of Powys (d. 1160) as having Arthur gerdernyd, menwyd Medrawd ("Arthur's strength, the good nature of Medrawd"). This would support the idea that early perceptions of Mordred were largely positive.

However, Mordred's later characterisation as the king's villainous son has a precedent in the figure of Amr (or Amhar), a son of Arthur's known from only two references. The more important of these, found in an appendix to the 9th-century chronicle Historia Brittonum (The History of the Britons), describes his marvelous grave beside the Herefordshire spring where he had been slain by his own father in some unchronicled tragedy. What connection exists between the stories of Amr and Mordred, if there is one, has never been satisfactorily explained.

Depictions in legend

In Geoffrey's influential Historia Regum Britanniae (The History of the Kings of Britain), written around 1136, Modredus (Mordred) is portrayed as the nephew of and traitor to King Arthur. Geoffrey might have based his Modredus on the early 6th-century "high king" of Gwynedd, Maglocunus (Maelgwn), whom the 6th-century writer Gildas had described as an usurper, or on Mandubracius, a 1st-century BC king of the Trinovantes. The unhistorical account presented by Geoffrey narrates Arthur leaving Modredus in charge of his throne as he crosses the English Channel to wage war on Lucius Tiberius of Rome. During Arthur's absence, Modredus crowns himself king and lives in an adulterous union with Arthur's wife, Ganhumara (Guinevere). Geoffrey does not make it clear how complicit Ganhumara is with his actions, simply stating that the Queen had "broken her vows" and "about this matter... [he] prefers to say nothing." This forces Arthur to return to Britain to fight at the Battle of Camlann, where Modredus is ultimately slain. Arthur, having been gravely wounded in battle, is sent off to be healed by Morgen in Avalon.

A number of Welsh sources also refer to Medraut, usually in relation to Camlann. One Welsh Triad, based on Geoffrey's Historia, provides an account of his betrayal of Arthur; in another, he is described as the author of one of the "Three Unrestrained Ravagings of the Isle of Britain" – he came to Arthur's court at Kelliwic in Cornwall, devoured all of the food and drink, and even dragged Gwenhwyfar (Guinevere) from her throne and beat her. In another Triad, however, he is described as one of "men of such gentle, kindly, and fair words that anyone would be sorry to refuse them anything." The Mabinogion also describes him in the terms of courtliness, calmness and purity.

Life in romances
Through the 13th century, the Old French cyclical literature of the chivalric romance genre greatly expanded on the history of Mordred prior to the war against Arthur (nevertheless, the 12th-century early romance stories such as those by Chrétien de Troyes would typically never even mention Mordred at all). In the Prose Merlin part of the Vulgate Cycle (in which his name is sometimes written as "Mordret"), Mordred's elder half-brother Gawain saves the infant Mordred and their mother Morgause from being taken away as prisoners by the Saxon king Taurus.

In the revision known as the Post-Vulgate Cycle, and consequently in Thomas Malory's English compilation Le Morte d'Arthur (The Death of Arthur), Arthur is told a cryptic (and, apparently, self-fulfilling) prophecy by Merlin about a just-born child that is to be his undoing, and so he tries to avert his fate by ordering to get rid of all May Day newborns. Whether they were intended to be killed or merely sent off to a distant land (the texts are vague about this), the ship on which the children were placed sinks and they drown. This episode (reminiscent of the Biblical Massacre of the Innocents and sometimes dubbed the "May Day massacre") leads to a war between Arthur and the furious King Lot (acting on his belief that he was biological father of Mordred), in which the latter king dies in a battle at the hands of Arthur's vassal king Pellinore, beginning a long and deadly blood feud between the two royal families of Lot and Pellinore. Unknown to both Lot and Arthur, the baby Mordred miraculously survives. He is found and rescued by a fisherman and his wife, who then raise him as their own son until he is 14. In this branch of the legend, following his early life as a commoner, the young Mordred is later reunited with his mother, which happens long after Merlin's downfall caused by the Lady of the Lake.

Mordred becomes involved in the adventures of his brothers (having grown to become the tallest among them), first as a squire and then as a knight, as well as others such as Brunor. Eventually, he joins King Arthur's elite fellowship of the Knights of the Round Table. Since the Post-Vulgate, however, Mordred tends to be depicted as murderously violent and known for his unchivalrious and lustful habits, including engaging in rape (as in an incident in the Post-Vulgate Queste, when he brutally kills a maiden and is injured for his actions by King Bagdemagus, who is then in turn mortally wounded by Gawain; there is also an attempted rape in the standalone romance Claris et Laris). Notably, it is Mordred who fatally stabs Pellinore's son in the back, later doing the same to one of the best Knights of the Round Table, Lamorak, in an unfair fight involving most of his brothers (one of whom had even murdered their own mother for being Lamorak's lover).

Mordred displays stronger knightly values in the Vulgate Cycle (as does Gawain too in comparison to his later Post-Vulgate portrayal), where he is also shown as womanising and murderous, but to a significantly lesser degree. In the Prose Lancelot, he becomes a protege and companion of the eponymous great knight Lancelot. The older knight comes to the young Mordred's rescue on multiple occasions, such as helping to save his life at the Castle of the White Thorn (Castel de la Blanche Espine), and Mordred in turn treats the much older Lancelot as his personal hero. In this version, his turning point toward villainy happens after they meet an old hermit monk who begins to tell his own prophecy for the two "most unfortunate knights", revealing Mordred's true parentage by Arthur and predicting Mordred's and Lancelot's respective roles in the coming ruin of Arthur's kingdom. However, the angry Mordred kills the monk before he can finish. While Lancelot tells his secret lover Guinevere (but not Arthur), she refuses to believe in the story of the prophecy and does not banish Mordred. The young knight, on his part, tries to get himself killed before accepting his destiny. The Prose Lancelot indicates Mordred was about 22 years old at the time, as well as just two years into his knighthood.

Eventually, Mordred overthrows Arthur's rule when the latter is engaged in the war against Lancelot (or during the second Roman War that followed it, depending on the version). In the Vulgate Mort Artu, Mordred achieves his coup with the help of a letter supposedly sent by the dying Arthur but actually forged by Mordred. The Mort Artu narration adds that "there was much good in Mordred, and as soon as he made himself elevated go the throne, he made himself well beloved by all," and so they were "ready to die to defend [his] honor" once Arthur did return with his army. Mordred's few opponents during his brief rule included Kay, who was gravely wounded by Mordred's supporters and died after fleeing to Brittany. In the Vulgate Mort Artu, Arthur proposes himself as a regent, while the French-influenced English poem Stanzaic Morte Arthur has council of Britain's knights first elects Mordred for the position in Arthur's absence as the most worthy candidate. The Alliterative Morte Arthure is a unique text in which Mordred is reluctant to be left by Arthur in charge of Britain. In the later romances, as in the chronicles, the returning Arthur's veteran army is ambushed and nearly destroyed by Mordred's supporters and foreign allies during their sea landing at Dover, where Gawain is mortally wounded while fighting as Arthur's loyalist. Afterwards, a series of inconclusive engagements follows, until both sides agree to all meet each other at the one final battle, in which Mordred typically fights exceptionally well while commanding the loyalty of thousands of men willing to lay down their lives for him against Arthur.

Family relations

Traditions vary regarding Mordred's relationship to Arthur. Medraut is never considered Arthur's son in Welsh texts, only his nephew, though The Dream of Rhonabwy mentions that the king had been his foster father. In early literature derived from Geoffrey's Historia, Mordred was considered the legitimate son of Arthur's sister or half-sister queen named Anna or Gwyar and her husband Lot, the king of either Lothian or Orkney. Today, however, he is best known as Arthur's own illegitimate son by his beautiful sister and Lot's wife, known as Morgause (Orcades / Morcades / Morgawse / Margawse), the Queen of Orkney. This motif was introduced in the Vulgate Cycle, in which their union happens at the time when neither of them have yet known of their blood relation and she was not married yet. Accounts of Mordred's incestuous origin story (including two different variants in just the different parts of the main version of the Vulgate Cycle) present the circumstances of it variably, attributing various degrees of blame or innocence to the either party of the teenage (usually aged 15) Arthur's tryst with his much older sister (already a mother of children almost his age).

Her eldest son Gawain has been Mordred's brother already in the Historia as well as in Layamon's Brut. Besides him, Mordred's other brothers or half-brothers often appearing in literature include Agravain and Gaheris in the tradition derived from the French romances, beginning with the prose versions of Robert de Boron's poems Merlin and Perceval. Another of the brothers, Gareth, joined them in the later versions. In the Vulgate Lancelot, Mordred is the youngest of the siblings who begins his knightly career as Agravain's own squire, and the two of them later conspire to reveal Lancelot's affair with Guinevere, resulting in Agravain's death and consequently the civil war between Arthur's and Lancelot's factions. In stark contrast to many modern works, Mordred's only interaction with Arthur's other sister Morgan in any medieval text occurs in the Post-Vulgate Queste, when all the Orkney brothers visit Morgan's castle and are informed by her about Guinevere's infidelity.

The 14th-century Scottish chronicler John of Fordun claimed that Mordred was the rightful heir to the throne of Britain, as Arthur was an illegitimate child (in his account, Mordred was the legitimate son of Lot and Anna, who here is Uther's sister). This sentiment was elaborated upon by Walter Bower and by Hector Boece, who in his Historia Gentis Scotorum goes so far as to say Arthur and Mordred's brother Gawain were traitors and villains and Arthur usurped the throne from Mordred. According to Boece, Arthur agreed to make Mordred his heir, but on the advice of the Britons who did not want Mordred to rule, he later made Constantine his heir; this led to the war in which Arthur and Mordred died. In John Mair's Scottish Historia Maioris Britanniae, Arthurus, Modred and Valvanus (Gawain) were all said to be underage and thus unfit to rule, with Arthur described as a bastard, though Mordred is also not being depicted heroically, as he seizes both the throne and Guanora (Guinevere) with help from mercenaries.

In the Historia and certain other texts, such as the Alliterative Morte Arthure reimagination of the Historia where Mordred is portrayed sympathetically, Mordred marries Guinevere (usually his aunt) consensually after he takes over the throne. However, in later writings like the Lancelot-Grail cycle and Le Morte d'Arthur, Guinevere (now the wife of Mordred's real father) is not treated as a traitor and instead flees Mordred's proposal and hides in the Tower of London. Willing adultery is still tied to her role in these later romances, but Mordred has been replaced as her lover by Lancelot. Related to this motif, the Galician-Portugaese Post-Vulgate Demanda makes Mordred hate Lancelot due to Mordred's own love for Guinevere.

The 18th-century Welsh antiquarian Lewis Morris, based on statements made by Boece, suggested that Medrawd had a wife named Cwyllog, daughter of Caw. Another late Welsh tradition was that Medrawd's wife was Gwenhwy(f)ach, sister of Guinevere.

Death
In Henry of Huntingdon's retelling of Geoffrey's Historia, Mordred is beheaded at Camlann in a lone charge against him and his entire host by Arthur himself, who suffers many injuries in the process. In the Alliterative Morte Arthure, Mordred first kills Gawain by his own hand in an early battle against Arthur's landing forces and then deeply grieves after him. In the Vulgate Mort Artu (and consequently in Malory's Le Morte d'Arthur), the terrible final battle begins by accident during a last-effort peace meeting between him and Arthur. In the ensuing fighting, Mordred personally slays his cousin Ywain after the latter's rescue of the unhorsed Arthur, and decapitates the already badly wounded Sagramore. He also kills Sagramore in addition to six other Round Table knights loyal to Arthur in the Post-Vulgate depiction of the battle, which presents this as an incredible and unprecedented feat. These and many other versions of the legend feature the motif of Arthur and Mordred striking down each other in a duel after most of the others on both sides have died. Furthermore, the Post-Vulgate says it was only the death of Sagramore, here depicted as Mordred's own foster brother, that finally motivated Arthur to kill his son immediately afterwards.

Le Morte d'Arthur features the now-iconic scene where the two meet on foot as Arthur charges Mordred and runs a spear through him. With the last of his strength, Mordred impales himself even further to be within striking distance, and lands a mortal blow with his sword to King Arthur's head. Malory's telling is a variant of the original account from the Vulgate Mort Artu, in which Arthur and Mordred both charge at each other on horses three times until Arthur drives his lance through Mordred's body, but then fully withdraws it (a ray of sunlight even shines through the hole) before Mordred's sword powerfully strikes his head and they both fall from their saddles. The Alliterative Morte Arthure has Mordred grievously wound Arthur with the ceremonial sword Clarent, stolen for him from Arthur by his co-conspirator Guinevere, but then Arthur slashes off Mordred's sword arm and brutally skewers him up on the sword Caliburn (Excalibur). One copy of the Welsh text Ymddiddan Arthur a'r Eryr has the dying Arthur tell Guinevere that he struck Mordred nine times with Caledfwlch (another name variant of Excalibur).

The Post-Vulgate retelling of Mort Artu deals with the aftermath of Mordred's death in more detail than the earlier works. In it, Arthur says before being taken away: "Mordred, in an evil hour did I beget you. You have ruined me and the kingdom of Logres, and you have died for it. Cursed be the hour in which you were born." One of the few survivors of Arthur's army, Bleoberis, then drags Mordred's corpse behind a horse around the battlefield of Salisbury Plain until it is torn to pieces. Later, as it had been commanded by the dying Arthur, the Archbishop of Canterbury constructs the Tower of the Dead tomb memorial, from which Bleoberis hangs Mordred's head as a warning against treason. It remains there for centuries until it is removed by the visiting Ganelon. Conversely, Margam Abbey's chronicle Annales de Margan claims Arthur had been buried alongside Mordred, here described as his nephew, in another tomb purportedly exhumed in the "real Avalon" at Glastonbury Abbey.

There have been also alternative stories of Mordred's demise. Thomas Grey's Scalacronica attributes the killing of Mordred to Ywan (Ywain) at Camlann. In the Italian La Tavola Ritonda (The Round Table), it is Lancelot who kills Mordred at the castle of Urbano where Mordred has besieged Guinevere after Arthur's death. In Ly Myreur des Histors (The Mirror of History) by Belgian writer Jean d'Outremeuse, Mordred survives the great battle and rules with the traitorous Guinevere until they are defeated and captured by Lancelot and King Carados in London. Guinevere is then executed by Lancelot and Mordred is entombed alive with her body, which he consumes before dying of starvation.

Offspring
Since Geoffrey, Mordred is often said to be succeeded by his sons. Stories always number them as two, though they are usually not named, nor is their mother.

In Geoffrey's version, after the Battle of Camlann, Constantine is appointed Arthur's successor. However, Mordred's two sons and their Saxon allies later rise against him. After they are defeated, one of them flees to sanctuary in the Church of Amphibalus in Winchester while the other hides in a London friary. Constantine tracks them down and kills them before the altars of their respective hiding places. This act invokes the vengeance of God, and three years later Constantine is killed by his nephew Aurelius Conanus. Geoffrey's account of the episode may be based on Constantine's murder of two "royal youths" as mentioned by Gildas.

In the Alliterative Morte Arthure, the dying Arthur personally orders Constantine to kill Mordred's infant children. Guinevere had been asked by Mordred to flee with them to Ireland, but she instead returns to Arthur's Caerleon without care or concern for the children's safety. The perhaps 15th-century Spanish chivalric romance Florambel de Lucea tells of the surviving Arthur having been saved by his sister Morgaina (Morgan) in a battle against the sons of Morderec (Mordred).

The elder of Mordred's sons is named Melehan (possibly the same as Melou from Layamon's Brut) in the Lancelot-Grail and the Post-Vulgate Cycle. In a battle near Winchester, Melehan slays Lionel, brother to Bors the Younger and a cousin of Lancelot. Bors then kills Melehan, avenging his brother's death, while the angry Lancelot chases after and kills the unnamed younger brother who tried to escape deep into a forest.

Modern portrayals

Mordred is especially prominent in popular modern era Arthurian literature, as well as in other media such as film, television, and comics. He has been played on screen by Leonard Penn (The Adventures of Sir Galahad, 1949), Brian Worth (The Adventures of Sir Lancelot, 1956–1957), David Hemmings (Camelot, 1967), Robert Addie (Excalibur, 1981), Nickolas Grace (Morte d'Arthur, 1984), Simon Templeman (The Legend of Prince Valiant, 1991–1993), Jason Done (Merlin, 1998), Craig Sheffer (Merlin: The Return, 2000), Hans Matheson (The Mists of Avalon, 2001), and Asa Butterfield and Alexander Vlahos (Merlin, 2008–2012), among others. In modern adaptations, the character of Morgause is usually conflated with that of Morgan, typically cast as Mordred's villainous mother (or alternatively his lover or wife), often manipulative and sometimes abusive. Some modern books and other media even have Mordred as a protagonist.

Virtually everywhere Mordred appears, his name is synonymous with treason. In Dante's Inferno, he is found in the lowest circle of Hell, set apart for traitors: "him who, at one blow, had chest and shadow / shattered by Arthur's hand" (Canto XXXII). A few works from the Middle Ages and today, however, portray Mordred as less a traitor and more a conflicted opportunist, or even a victim of fate. Even Malory, who depicts Mordred as a villain, notes that the people rallied to him because, "with Arthur was none other life but war and strife, and with Sir Mordred was great joy and bliss."

See also
Illegitimacy in fiction 
Incest in literature

References

Citations

Bibliography
Bromwich, Rachel (2006). Trioedd Ynys Prydein: The Triads of the Island of Britain. University of Wales Press. 
Lacy, Norris J. (Ed.), The New Arthurian Encyclopedia, pp. 8–9. New York: Garland. .
Lacy, Norris J.; Ashe, Geoffrey; and Mancroff, Debra N. (1997). The Arthurian Handbook. New York: Garland. .

External links

Mordred at The Camelot Project
The different accounts of Mordred's death at Camlann (Salisbury Plain)

Arthurian characters
Fictional cannibals
Fictional characters who committed sedition or treason
Fictional offspring of incestuous relationships
Fictional offspring of rape
Fictional patricides
King Arthur's family
Knights of the Round Table
Male characters in literature
Male characters in television
Male literary villains
Mythological kings
Mythological princes
Mythological swordfighters